Ilyoplax sayajiraoi is a species of crab that was discovered in April 2015. The species was discovered by researchers at Maharaja Sayajirao University of Baroda, located in India. The species is of the genus Ilyoplax. The species was named after Sayajirao Gaekwad III.

Background
The species was discovered by Kauresh Vachhrajani and his students on mud flat surfaces located in Kamboi.

References

Ocypodoidea
Crustaceans described in 2015